Bert is a  peak located in the Gorgany mountain range of Carpathian Mountains in western Ukraine. It is situated near Lopukhiv in Zakarpattia Oblast.

References

Geography of Zakarpattia Oblast
Mountains of the Eastern Carpathians
One-thousanders of Ukraine